Scott Island is a small uninhabited island of volcanic origin in the Ross Sea, Southern Ocean,  northeast of Cape Adare, the northeastern extremity of Victoria Land, Antarctica. The island has two small coves with beaches, the rest of the island being surrounded by high cliffs. One of the coves is on the northeastern coast and the other opposite Haggitts Pillar on the western coast of the island.

The island was discovered and landed upon on 25 December 1902 by captain William Colbeck, commander of the SY Morning, the relief ship for Robert Scott's expedition. Colbeck originally planned to name the island Markham Island, after Sir Clements Markham, but later decided to name it after Scott. Haggits Pillar is named after Colbeck's mother's family name, Haggit.

Scott Island is part of the Ross Dependency, claimed by New Zealand (see Territorial claims of Antarctica).

There was an automatic weather station on the island from December 1987 to March 1999.

On 12 February 2009 Andrew Perry and Molly Kendall, crew members of the Sea Shepherd Conservation Society's ship MY Steve Irwin, were married on the island by captain Paul Watson.

See also

 Composite Antarctic Gazetteer
 SCAR
 Territorial claims in Antarctica
 List of Antarctic islands south of 60° S
 List of islands
 Desert island

References

External links
Birds observed at Scott Island, Ross Sea, Antarctica
Gerhard Wörner and Giovanni Orsi (1990). Volcanic observations on Scott Island in the Antarctic Ocean, Polarforschung, 60 (2), 82–83.

Islands of the Ross Dependency
Uninhabited islands of New Zealand